Friends for Schuur is a 2000 album by Diane Schuur, produced by Phil Ramone, featuring duets with Ray Charles and Stevie Wonder. It was Schuur's debut album for Concord Records. The album peaked at #22 on the Billboard Contemporary Jazz Albums chart.

Track listing
 "Easy Living" (Ralph Rainger, Leo Robin) – 4:26
 "I'd Fly" (Riccardo Cocciante, Jean Paul Drean, Roxanne Seeman) – 5:07
 "For the First Time" (Gerry Goffin, Ken Hirsch) – 4:44
 "It Might Be You" (Alan Bergman, Marilyn Bergman, Dave Grusin) – 4:58
 "Love Like Ours" (A. Bergman, M. Bergman, Grusin) – 4:20
 "Red Cab to Manhattan" (Steven Bishop) – 6:01
 "The Heart Never Learns" (Jorge Casas, Lawrence Dermer) – 4:19
 "Never Take That Chance Again" (Burt Bacharach, Tonio K) – 4:41
 "It Had to Be You" (Isham Jones, Gus Kahn) – 5:29
 "I Just Called to Say I Love You" (Stevie Wonder) – 4:35
 "Finally" (Stephanie Andrews, Wonder) – 6:55

Personnel

Performance
 Diane Schuur - vocals, piano

References

2000 albums
Diane Schuur albums
Concord Records albums